Frank Holmes (1908–1990) was one of Manitoba's first filmmakers, filming the documentary Seaport of the Prairies in 1925 when he was just 17 years old.
He is also remembered for the documentaries Beyond the Steel and Each Year They Come.

Holmes had to go to court to receive his payment for making Seaport of the Prairies.

In 1928, he produced Forest Fire Fighters of the Skies.

The Archives of Manitoba preserves 29 reels of his films.

References 

1908 births
1990 deaths
Canadian documentary film directors
Film directors from Winnipeg